Trident is an anthology comic series published by Trident Comics from 1989  to 1990.

Publication history
It was the flagship title of Trident Comics and attempted to publish new talent as well as established talent such as Neil Gaiman and Grant Morrison.

Although the title initially proved popular, sales flagged when issues shipped late, and it eventually ceased publication in 1991, with the bankruptcy of Trident Comics.

Stories
Notable stories include:
 Bacchus by Eddie Campbell
 The Light Brigade by Neil Gaiman and Nigel Kitching
 St. Swithin's Day by Grant Morrison and Paul Grist

References

Comics anthologies
1989 comics debuts